Heartbreaker is the debut album of South Korean singer-songwriter and rapper G-Dragon, member of Big Bang. The chart-topping single "Heartbreaker", became one of the best selling singles in South Korea of all time, having sold over 4 million copies since its release. Heartbreaker was the best-selling album by a South Korean solo artist since its release until 2019.

Release and singles
Although initially scheduled to be released in April, the release date was pushed back to August to coincide with his 21st birthday.  G-Dragon collaborated with several YG labelmates, including Teddy Park of 1TYM, bandmate Taeyang, and CL and Dara of 2NE1. The lead single "Heartbreaker" landed at number-one on multiple charts, including the Mnet and Melon Music chart, while "Breathe" was ranked in the Top 20. "A Boy" described the personal struggles he went through as he started in the entertainment industry at the age of 6, eventually becoming a trainee at YG Entertainment when he was 12. "The Leaders", which featured Teddy and CL, referenced Girls' Generation's song "Gee", Kim Kyu Jong (of SS501)'s "Wuss Up", and 2NE1's "I Don't Care".

Controversy 
G-Dragon was accused of plagiarism by Sony Music, as his tracks "Heartbreaker" and "Butterfly" were thought to be similar to Flo Rida's "Right Round" and Oasis's "She's Electric", respectively. EMI, who also owned the rights to "Right Round" stated they saw no similarities between the two songs. In response, Sony Korea denied G-Dragon the ability to promote the track any further without paying reparations. On September 21, 2009, Sisa Magazine, a news program on MBC, stated that officials from Sony reportedly sent YG Entertainment warning letters about plagiarism. Sony's legal representative stated, "It was a hard decision for the music critics." However, they decided that there were similarities and accordingly issued a warning letter to the production company and composers. However, YG Entertainment claimed nothing had been decided or legally determined and that the "letter" which YG received from Sony was not considered legal action; they also stated they have not received a direct response from the American publishers regarding the matter. On March 6, 2010, YG Entertainment announced that they personally contacted Flo Rida's representatives and that he will appear as a featured artist in a new version of "Heartbreaker", to be released as a bonus track on G-Dragon's concert album Shine a Light. On May 22, G-Dragon appeared as a special guest at Flo Rida's concert in Korea and performed the new version of "Heartbreaker".

Track listing

Sales

Accolades

Release history

References

External links
 Official Website

2009 albums
G-Dragon albums
YG Entertainment albums
Korean-language albums
Albums produced by G-Dragon